is a Japanese volleyball player. He currently plays for Japan national team and JTEKT Stings in V.League Division 1. He was the captain of the Waseda University volleyball club and the Japanese national team at the 2017 Eastern Asian Men's Volleyball Championship.

International competition 
 Japan universiade national team (2017)
2017 Summer Universiade
2017 Eastern Asian Men's Volleyball Championship
Japan men's national volleyball team (2021–present)
2021 Asian Men's Volleyball Championship

Awards

Individual
2020-21 V. League — Fair Play Award
 The 70th Kurowashiki All Japan Volleyball Tournament — Best 6

High school year 
2010 All Japan High School Volleyball Championships —  Runner-up, with 
2011 All Japan High School Volleyball Championships —  Runner-up, with Chinzei High School

College year 
2012 All Japan Intercollegiate Volleyball Championship —  Bronze medal, with Waseda University
2013 All Japan Intercollegiate Volleyball Championship —  Champion, with Waseda University
2015 All Japan Intercollegiate Volleyball Championship —  Bronze medal, with Waseda University

Club teams 
2018 Kurowashiki All Japan Volleyball Tournament —  Runner-up, with JTEKT Stings
2019-20 V. League —  Champion, with JTEKT Stings
2020 Emperor's Cup —  Champion, with JTEKT Stings
2022 Emperor's Cup —  Champion, with JTEKT Stings

Personal life 
On September 23, 2021, he announced that he was married.

See also 
 List of Waseda University people
《男子バレー》“苦労人”福山汰一（27）が名乗りを上げるミドルブロッカー争い…急成長の転機となった「ステップ」とは？ at Number (magazine)

References 

1993 births
Japanese men's volleyball players
Living people
Sportspeople from Kumamoto Prefecture
Waseda University alumni
Medalists at the 2017 Summer Universiade
Middle blockers